Tunis Top Secret is a 1959 Italian-German adventure-spy film written and directed by Bruno Paolinelli and starring Elsa Martinelli and Giorgia Moll.

Plot

Cast 
  Elsa Martinelli as Kathy Sands
  Giorgia Moll as Simone Fredrick
  Raf Mattioli as Dr. Fuat / Seymour
  Claus Biederstaedt as Mr. George
  Gina Albert as Countess Barbara
  Willy Fritsch as Major Knickerbocker
  Chelo Alonso as Sherazad / Soraya
 Juan Santacreu  as Fidia
  Giuseppe Porelli 	as Baron Philippe
  Massimo Serato as Nikos
  Luigi Bonos as Pedro
  Ignazio Dolce

References

External links

1959 films
Italian spy comedy films
West German films
German spy comedy films
1959 adventure films
Films directed by Bruno Paolinelli
Films set in Tunisia
1950s Italian films
1950s German films